Centerpoint is an unincorporated community in Gallia County, in the U.S. state of Ohio.

History
A variant name was Wales. A post office called Wales was established in 1855, and remained in operation until 1906.

References

Unincorporated communities in Gallia County, Ohio
Unincorporated communities in Ohio